Leg wraps or boots are used for the protection of the lower legs of horses during training, shipping, and exercise, as well as for therapeutic and medical purposes to provide support or cover for injuries. Variations include:

Bell boots
Polo wraps, sometimes called track bandages when used in horse racing
Shipping bandage or travel boots
Stable bandage or standing wraps. These sometimes use Cohesive bandage material (aka "Vetwrap"), especially for veterinary uses
Splint boots or brushing boots
Skid boots

See also

Horse protective equipment